Gorkovsky District is an administrative and municipal district (raion), one of the thirty-two in Omsk Oblast, Russia. It is located in the eastern central part of the oblast. Its administrative center is the urban locality (a work settlement) of Gorkovskoye. Population: 20,807 (2010 Census);  The population of Gorkovskoye accounts for 25.8% of the district's total population.

References

Notes

Sources

Districts of Omsk Oblast